Paul Bernard Jones (born 13 May 1953 in Ellesmere Port, Cheshire) is a former professional footballer who played as a defender in the Football League for Bolton Wanderers, where he spent most of his career, Huddersfield Town, Oldham Athletic, Blackpool, Rochdale and Stockport County. He was educated at The Whitby High School, Ellesmere Port, where he was spotted by a Bolton scout; as were Barry Siddall and Neil Whatmore. Paul also made the Full England Squad in 1977 but did not make an appearance.

After his playing career ended he spent time scouting for former club Bolton Wanderers, Hull City and Crystal Palace and in 2009 completed a spell coaching in Hunan Province, China.

References

External links
 League stats at Neil Brown's site
 Bolton stats and photo at Sporting Heroes

1953 births
Living people
People from Ellesmere Port
English footballers
Association football defenders
Bolton Wanderers F.C. players
Huddersfield Town A.F.C. players
Oldham Athletic A.F.C. players
Blackpool F.C. players
Rochdale A.F.C. players
Stockport County F.C. players
English Football League players
Stockport County F.C. non-playing staff
Sportspeople from Cheshire